José Antonio Zapata y Nadal, or y Dadad (1762 – 31 August 1837) was a Spanish painter, active in Valencia.

He studied at the Escuela de San Carlos where he received several awards at the school's competitions; for history painting and, in 1792, first place for flower painting. In 1798, was named a "Member of Merit". In 1815, he was chosen to be Director of the Department of Decorative Painting. He also became an "Academic of Merit" at the Real Academia de Bellas Artes de San Fernando.

Although primarily remembered for his flower paintings and other decorative work, he also created portraits and religious paintings at churches in Alzira, El Cabanyal, Palma de Mallorca and numerous other places.

References

External links

More sources on Zapata @ the Frick Collection

1762 births
1837 deaths
People from Valencia
Painters from the Valencian Community
Spanish floral still life painters
18th-century Spanish painters
18th-century Spanish male artists
Spanish male painters
19th-century Spanish painters
19th-century Spanish male artists